Jabez Darnell (28 March 1884 – 1950) was a professional footballer who played for Northampton Town and Tottenham Hotspur.

Tottenham Hotspur career 
The left half transferred to the club from Biggleswade Town. Between 1908 and 1915, Darnell took part in a total 160 matches and scoring on ten occasions in all competitions.

References

External links
Darnell biography/ 

1884 births
1950 deaths
People from Potton
English footballers
Northampton Town F.C. players
Tottenham Hotspur F.C. players
English Football League players
Association football midfielders
Footballers from Bedfordshire